In molecular biology, the CUT domain (also known as ONECUT) is a DNA-binding motif which can bind independently or in cooperation with the homeodomain,  which is often found downstream of the CUT domain. Proteins display two modes of DNA binding, which hinge on the homeodomain and on the linker that separates it from the CUT domain, and two modes of transcriptional stimulation, which hinge on the homeodomain.

References

Protein domains